Hayes is a rural locality in the local government area (LGA) of Derwent Valley in the South-east LGA region of Tasmania. The 2016 census recorded a population of 110 for the state suburb of Hayes.

History 
Hayes was gazetted as a locality in 1970.

Geography
The River Derwent forms the south-western boundary, and Johnnys Creek forms part of the eastern before flowing through to the Derwent.

Road infrastructure
Route A10 (Lyell Highway) runs through from south-east to south-west.

References

Localities of Derwent Valley Council
Towns in Tasmania
Southern Tasmania